Blitzkrieg at the Ardennes is a 1989 video game published by Command Simulations.

Gameplay
Blitzkrieg at the Ardennes is a game in which the German offensive in the West in December 1944 of World War II, the "Battle of the Bulge" or "Wacht am Rhein" is simulated.

Reception
Robert A Hottin reviewed the game for Computer Gaming World, and stated that "this is a challenging game. It is easy to learn, stimulating to play and offers a reasonable simulation of some of the choices available to the respective Army commanders."

Reviews
Raze - Dec, 1990

References

External links
Review in Commodore Magazine
Review in K 6 (Italian)
Review in Tilt (French)

1989 video games
Amiga games
Computer wargames
DOS games
Turn-based strategy video games
Video games about Nazi Germany
Video games developed in the United States
Video games set in France
World War II video games